
Year 291 (CCXCI) was a common year starting on Thursday (link will display the full calendar) of the Julian calendar. At the time, it was known as the Year of the Consulship of Tiberianus and Dio (or, less frequently, year 1044 Ab urbe condita). The denomination 291 for this year has been used since the early medieval period, when the Anno Domini calendar era became the prevalent method in Europe for naming years.

Events 
 By place 
 Roman Empire 
 Winter: The emperors Diocletian and Maximian convene in Milan.
 An uneasy peace is established between the emperors Diocletian and Maximian on the one hand, and the rival emperor Carausius on the other.
 Perhaps in cooperation with the forces of Maximian, Carausius campaigns successfully against Germanic raids in Gaul and Britain. Also during his reign, Carausius begins building the forts of the Saxon Shore.

 Northern Europe 
 The Alemanni, having been expelled from part of their territory by the Burgundians, seek to regain their lost lands. These peoples had unsuccessfully invaded Gaul in tandem in 285/6, and the Alemanni had likely been weakened by the Roman counter-invasions of 287 and 288.
 A force of Goths defeat the Burgundians.
 The Tervingian Goths and Taifali fight the Vandals and Gepids.

 Africa 
 The Blemmyes invade the Kingdom of Kush.

 Persian Empire 
 King Bahram II fights against a coalition consisting of his brother Hormizd of Sakastan, Sassanian vassal Hormizd I Kushashah, and the Gilans.

 China 
 War of the Eight Princes: After the death of Emperor Sima Yan (Jin Wudi), a civil war breaks out among the princes and dukes of the Jin Dynasty. The struggle devastates and depopulates the provinces of northern China.

Births 
 Saint Agnes, Christian martyress (d. c. 304)
 Saint Hilarion, anchorite and saint (d. 371)  
 Li Xiu, female general during the Jin Dynasty
 Saint Philomena, Christian martyress (d. c. 304)

Deaths 
 Sima Liang, regent during the reign of Sima Yan  
 Sima Wei, prince during the Jin Dynasty (b. 271)
 Wei Guan, general of the Kingdom of Wei (b. 220)
 Wen Yang, general of the Kingdom of Wei  (b. 238)
 Yang Jun, official during the reign of Sima Yan

References